Keak da Sneak is a solo album released by rapper, Keak da Sneak. It was released on November 9, 2004 for Moe Doe Entertainment and was produced by E-A-Ski, Tone Capone and D-Dre.

Track listing
"East Oakland"- 4:19
"Same Ol' Shit"- 3:01
"Amigo"- 4:09 (Featuring Yukmouth)
"All I Need"- 4:34
"Hands in the Sky"- 5:01
"Fast Lane"- 3:56
"Untouchable"- 4:42
"Square Ass Nigga"- 2:59
"Why"- 4:06
"Cream"- 4:37 (Featuring Spice 1)
"Can't You See"- 4:12
"Mind of a Soldier"- 4:10

2004 albums
Keak da Sneak albums